Rodney Earl Bolton (born September 23, 1968) is a retired Major League Baseball pitcher. He played during two seasons at the major league level for the Chicago White Sox. He was drafted by the White Sox in the 13th round of the 1990 amateur draft. Bolton played his first professional season with their Class-A (Short Season) Utica Blue Sox and Class A South Bend White Sox in 1990, and his last with the Milwaukee Brewers' Triple-A Indianapolis Indians in 2001.

References

External links

1968 births
Living people
Baseball players from Tennessee
American expatriate baseball players in Canada
American expatriate baseball players in Japan
Kentucky Wildcats baseball players
Major League Baseball pitchers
Chicago White Sox players
Fukuoka Daiei Hawks players
Utica Blue Sox players
South Bend White Sox players
Sarasota White Sox players
Birmingham Barons players
Vancouver Canadians players
Nashville Sounds players
Indianapolis Indians players
Scranton/Wilkes-Barre Red Barons players
Camden Riversharks players